Ampang Park Shopping Centre was a shopping centre located on Jalan Ampang in Kuala Lumpur, also was called as Ampang Park. It was the first shopping centre to be built in Malaysia. It is designed by the architect of Singapore's People's Park Complex, the Design Partnership, in conjunction with Kuala Lumpur-based architect Thomas A.S. Tiang. The developers were the Low Keng Huat Brothers Realty Sdn Bhd. Ampang Park was closed on 31 December 2017 and demolished in 2018 to make way for the construction of MRT Ampang Park Station which opened on 16 March 2023. Further redevelopment of the former site is yet to begun and the site currently serve as a temporary recreational park along with connecting walkway path to Ampang Park LRT Station.

Features
The mall opened in 1973. It was planned for a  site, at the junction of Jalan Ampang and Jalan Pekeliling, in the fashionable Ampang residential district. In contrast to the tradition of shop lots which are oriented towards the street, the modern architecture faced inwards to an internal street, or atrium. It was initially planned to be fully air-conditioned, but as built, the atrium was cooled via natural cross-ventilation.

It was features include a carpark for 450 vehicles, a children's playground, an entertainment deck, an exhibition gallery, a "theatrette", and escalators and lifts.
It was the opening volley in a series of shopping centers that would make Kuala Lumpur renown for its stores.

Transit

The mall is connected to the Kelana Jaya Line by the  Ampang Park LRT Station. Ampang Park is also a bus hub for Ampang-bound buses, namely routes 300 and 303 which connect Ampang Park to  KLCC and  Ampang LRT station. It will also be integrated with MRT SSP's Ampang Park MRT Station.

Demolition plans
In October 2015, news broke out that the iconic mall will be demolished to make way for MRT2 project. The tenants and shop owners of the mall is suggesting that the proposed MRT station be built underneath a field, behind the shopping centre. Subsequently, "Save Ampang Park" campaign was set up to urge the government to reconsider the demolition.

MRT Corp has given two options for the strata owners; land acquisition or mutual agreement whereby the MRT Corp would demolish Ampang Park Shopping Centre and build a new shopping centre for the owners once the Ampang Park MRT project is completed in seven years. On 6 November 2015, MRT Corp announced that the mall is spared from demolition, following a new design option for its Ampang Park station. However, with the new design, a full physical integration between the MRT Ampang Park station and the Light Rail Transit (LRT) Ampang Park station could not be constructed.

On 18 January 2017, Court of Appeal dismissed a judicial review application by 39 strata owners of the shopping centre against the land acquisition for the Klang Valley Mass Rapid Transit (MRT) Ampang Park station project.

Closure and demolition
As a result of following the review dismissal, demolition or potential land acquisition for Ampang Park proceeded. On 29 November 2017, all tenants were notified that Ampang Park will cease operations on 31 December, as the power and water supplies will be cut off at midnight. By Christmas, 70% of tenants have moved out, while others opted to remain until the last day of operations.

In the final days leading up to its closure, Ampang Park was well crowded, with visitors taking their last pictures while some others were taking their advantages of clearance sales.

Ampang Park was closed for good after almost 45 years of operation on 31 December 2017; dismantling works began immediately soon after. In January 2018, ceiling, fixtures and electrical wiring were being removed in the mall's interior, which was raising public safety concerns. On 23 January 2018, MRT Corp released a statement disassociating itself from any dismantling works in the mall, as the land acquisition for Ampang Park was still ongoing. A police report was made before the statement released. After the land acquisition completed, Ampang Park was surrounded by fences before the demolition begin in May 2018 and demolition completed in September 2018.

In popular culture

Featured in The Amazing Race 

The shopping complex was featured in the third season of The Amazing Race as a location that contestants must reach (specifically, a photography shop known as "Citifoto") to develop photographs of the Petronas Twin Towers. Teams had a hard time finding this shopping mall, so they asked local Malaysians to help them to get there.

Esok Masih Ada 

The shopping complex was also featured in Esok Masih Ada (1980) for a bank robbery

See also
 List of shopping malls in Malaysia

References

1973 establishments in Malaysia
2017 disestablishments in Malaysia
Shopping malls in Kuala Lumpur
Defunct shopping malls in Malaysia
Shopping malls established in 1973
Shopping malls disestablished in 2017
Demolished buildings and structures in Malaysia
Buildings and structures demolished in 2018